Féilim (also written Felim, Féidhlim or Fedlimid, often without the síneadh fada) is an Irish language name for men, which means "beauty, ever good, constant." The name is derived from the older version Feidlimid. The 'í/idh' at the end of the name is a diminutive suffix common in Irish language names/nicknames (i.e. Féilimí, and Féidhlimí). Féilim has been anglicised as Phelim, Feilmy or even Felix.

List of people

Feidlimid
Feidlimid mac Coirpri Chruimm (d. 596?), perhaps king of Munster
Feidlimid mac Cremthanin (d. 846), king of Munster
Fedlimid mac Daill (also Feidhlimidh Mac Daill, or Felim mac Dall), a bard of the Irish mythology, father of Deirdre
Feidlimid mac Óengusa (d. c. 500?), king of Munster
Feidlimid mac Tigernaig (d. 588?), perhaps king of Munster
Fedlimid Rechtmar

Féilim
 Saint Felim (also spelled Feidlimid, Feidhlimidh, Felimy, Feidhilmethie, Feidlimthe, Fedlimid, Fedlimidh, Phelim, or Phelime), an Irish hermit and priest of the mid sixth century
 Felim Ua Conchobair (also Felim mac Cathal Crobderg Ua Conchobair), king of Connacht between 1233 and 1265
 Aedh mac Felim Ó Conchobair, his son and king of Connacht between 1265 and 1274
 Aedh Muimhnech mac Felim Ua Conchobair, king of Connacht between 1274 and 1280
 Felim, Feilim or Fedlim Ó Conchobair, king of Connacht between 1310 and 1316
 Felim McFiach O'Byrne, a Gaelic chieftain died in 1630
 Felim O'Neill of Kinard (also Phelim MacShane O'Neill, or Féilim Ó Néill), Irish catholic nobleman leader of the Irish Rebellion of 1641 and executed during the Cromwellian conquest of Ireland in 1652
 Felim Egan, Irish painter born in 1952
It is also used for:
 Fedlimid mac Daill (also Feidhlimidh Mac Daill, or Felim mac Dall), a bard of the Irish mythology, father of Deirdre
 Cavan Cathedral, consacred as Cathedral of Saint Patrick and Saint Felim
 Slieve Felim Mountains (Irish: Sliabh Eibhlinne), mountain range in Ireland in County Limerick
 Slieve Felim Way, a long-distance trail in Ireland between Murroe in County Limerick and Silvermine Mountains in County Tipperary.

Phelim
Phelim (Felix) O'Neill (died 1709), head of the Clanaboy O'Neill dynasty, and Chief of this Catholic Lineage
Phelim Boyle (born 1941), professor of finance in the School of Business and Economics at Wilfrid Laurier University in Canada
Phelim Calleary (1895–1974), Irish Fianna Fáil politician
Phelim Caoch O'Neill (also Phelim Caoch Ó Neill, or Feidhlimidh Caoch Ó Néill), Prince of the Cenél nEógain from 1517 to 1542
Phelim Drew (born 1969), Irish actor
Phelim McDermott (born 1963), English actor and stage director
Phelim O'Neill, 2nd Baron Rathcavan (1909–1994), politician in Northern Ireland and a hereditary peer in the British House of Lords

See also
 Fidelma

External links
 Index of Names in Irish Annals: Fedelmid, Feidlimid / Feidhlimidh, Feidhlim, Feilim at Medieval Scotland

Irish-language masculine given names